Afroeurydemus guessfeldi is a species of leaf beetle of West Africa, the Republic of the Congo and the Democratic Republic of the Congo, described by Ferdinand Karsch in 1882.

References 

Eumolpinae
Beetles of Africa
Insects of West Africa
Insects of the Republic of the Congo
Beetles of the Democratic Republic of the Congo
Taxa named by Ferdinand Karsch
Beetles described in 1882